The following lists events that happened during 2005 in the Sahrawi Arab Democratic Republic.

Events

August
 August 18 - The Polisario Front frees the last 404 of its prisoners of war to end armed conflict with Morocco.

References

 
2000s in Western Sahara
Years of the 21st century in Western Sahara
Western Sahara
Western Sahara